Albert Culton is an American former basketball player. He played college basketball for the Texas A&M Aggies and UT Arlington Mavericks.

Culton attended Ennis High School in Ennis, Texas. He averaged 22.6 points and 19.6 rebounds per game as a senior while he led his team to its first district title and earned first-team all-state honors. He was heavily recruited by colleges, including most teams in the Southwest Conference, and signed a letter of intent with the Texas A&M Aggies on April 14, 1977. He transferred to play for the UT Arlington Mavericks and was named the Southland Conference Freshman of the Year in 1981. He averaged 18.0 points and 9.6 rebounds per game during the 1981–82 season and was selected as the Southland Player of the Year.

Culton was selected by the Dallas Mavericks as the 209th overall pick in the 1982 NBA draft. He played for the Harlem Globetrotters.

References

External links
College statistics
UT Arlington Mavericks bio

Year of birth missing (living people)
Living people
American men's basketball players
Basketball players from Texas
Dallas Mavericks draft picks
Forwards (basketball)
Harlem Globetrotters players
People from Ennis, Texas
Texas A&M Aggies men's basketball players
UT Arlington Mavericks men's basketball players